= Lion Devouring a Rabbit =

1853 painting by Eugène Delacroix

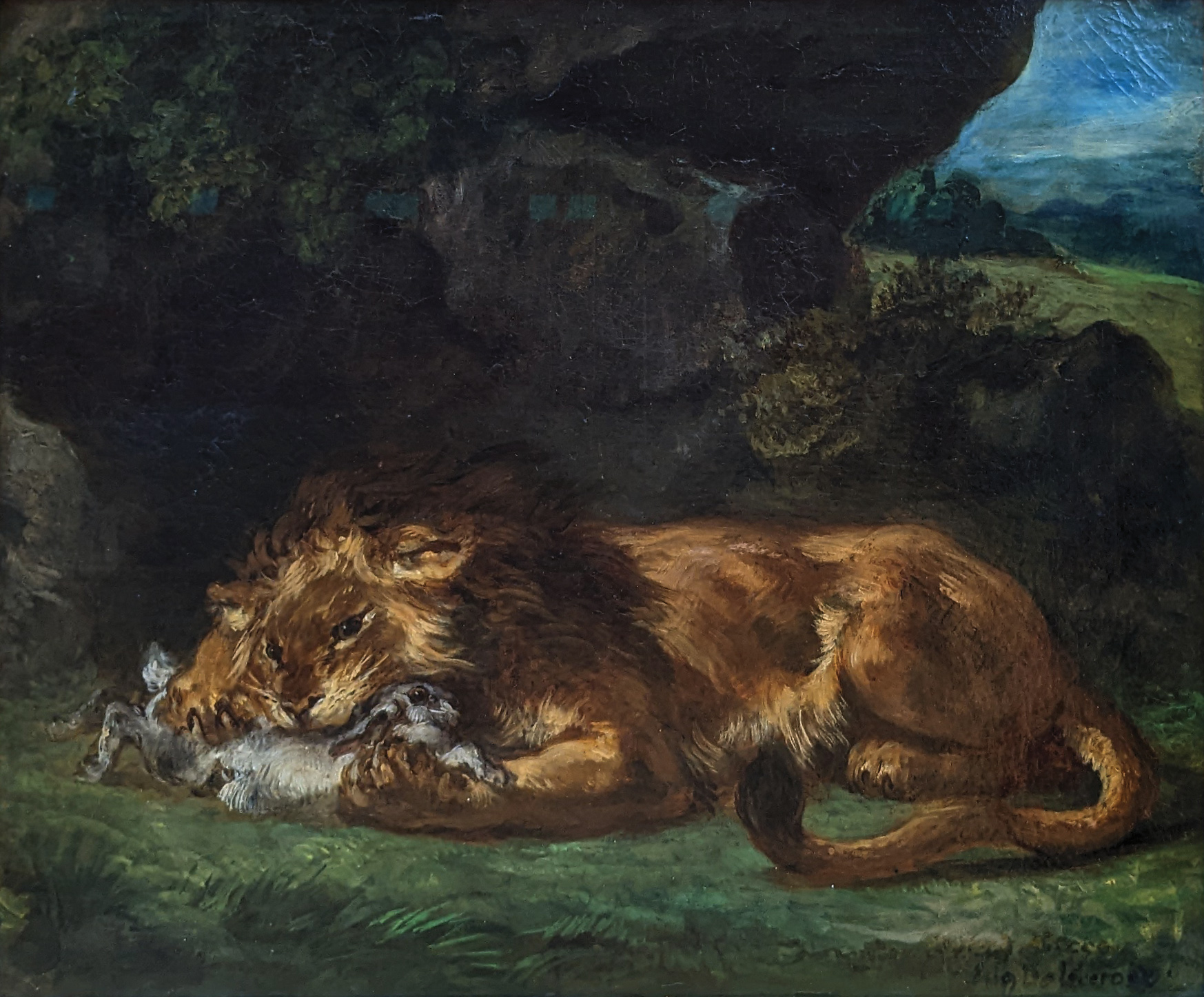
Lion Devouring a Rabbit (1853), by Eugène Delacroix

Lion Devouring a Rabbit is an oil painting on canvas executed in 1853 by the French artist Eugène Delacroix, now in the Louvre in Paris.

It depicts a lion in a cave or under a rock structure, consuming a captured rabbit.
